1–5 Blake Street is a Grade II listed terrace of buildings in the city centre of York, in England.

The current terrace originated in the 16th century, as a large, timber-framed, building, with four parallel ranges, gabled to the street and to the rear, covering what is now 1 and 3 Blake Street.  This was probably a two-storey building, and is described by the Royal Commission on the Historical Monuments of England as having been "exceptional in the city in its degree of elaboration".  To the rear of the building was a yard, now fully enclosed, with a Magnesian Limestone wall which appears to have been built from stone shaped in the 12th century.

In the 17th century, the northernmost range was extended to project to the rear, and late in the century, an attic storey was added to part of 1 Blake Street.  The building was remodelled in the second quarter of the 18th century, with the a new front to Blake Street built in brick, the roof largely replaced, and a new staircase added at the rear.  The street may have been widened at this point, so the front may be on an entirely new alignment.  5 Blake Street was built at the same time, with a front in the same style, and it may also include some remains of an earlier timber-framed building.  Repeated alterations in the 19th and 20th century include further extensions to the rear of the terrace, new shop fronts for 1 and 5 Blake Street and the removal of some internal walls, but the Georgian windows survive, unusually, in 3 Blake Street, even at ground floor level.

The Blake Street facade is 11 bays long and two storeys high, and there are nine sash windows at first floor level.  There is a drainpipe head dated 1765.  Inside, the first floor of 1 Blake Street has some 17th century panelling, which may have been moved from elsewhere.  3 Blake Street has a 17th-century door frame on the ground floor, and a late 17th century staircase.  Its first floor is combined with that of 5 Blake Street.  One room has early-17th century panelling, and there are several Georgian fireplaces and cornices.  5 Blake Street has a 19th-century domed ceiling with a rooflight which previously lit a spiral staircase, later removed.

References

Blake Street 1
Timber framed buildings in Yorkshire